Emma Brownlie (born 4 September 1993) is a Scottish footballer who plays as a defender for Heart of Midlothian in the Scottish Women's Premier League. She has represented Scotland on the Scotland under-19 national team.

Club career
Brownlie started her career with Hibernian before moving to Celtic in 2013 then rejoining Hibs in January 2015.

In January 2019, Brownlie signed with FA WSL side Everton L.F.C., reuniting her with former Hiberian manager, Willie Kirk. She made her debut for the Blues against Chelsea in the FA Women's Cup. In September 2019, Brownlie joined Rangers. She joined Hearts Women in 2022.

Brownlie was named SWPL player of the month for January 2023.

International career
Brownlie has been called up and played for the Scotland under-19 national team. Her stints with the under-19s both participated in qualification to the 2011 and 2012 UEFA Women's Under-19 Championship.

References

External links

Living people
1993 births
Women's Super League players
Hibernian W.F.C. players
Scottish Women's Premier League players
Everton F.C. (women) players
Scottish women's footballers
Women's association football defenders
Celtic F.C. Women players
Rangers W.F.C. players
Footballers from Dunfermline
Heart of Midlothian W.F.C. players